William John Browning (April 11, 1850 – March 24, 1920) was an American Republican party politician who represented New Jersey's 1st congressional district as a U.S. Representative from 1911, until his death in 1920.

Born in Camden, New Jersey, Browning attended the Friends' School. At an early age engaged in the wholesale dry goods business in Camden. He served as member of the Camden Board of Education and of the city council. He was appointed postmaster of Camden on June 18, 1889, and served until June 1, 1894, when his successor was appointed. He was Chief Clerk of the House of Representatives of the United States 1895–1911.

Browning was elected as a Republican to the Sixty-second Congress to fill the vacancy caused by the death of Henry C. Loudenslager. He was reelected to the Sixty-third and to the three succeeding Congresses and served from November 7, 1911, until his death in the Capitol Building, Washington, D.C., March 24, 1920. He was interred in Harleigh Cemetery, Camden, New Jersey.

See also

List of United States Congress members who died in office (1900–49)

External links

William Browning at The Political Graveyard

 William J. Browning, late a representative from New Jersey, Memorial addresses delivered in the House of Representatives and Senate frontispiece 1917

1850 births
1920 deaths
Politicians from Camden, New Jersey
Republican Party members of the United States House of Representatives from New Jersey
Burials at Harleigh Cemetery, Camden